King's Disease II is the fourteenth studio album by American rapper Nas. It was released on August 6, 2021, through Mass Appeal Records and marketed by The Orchard. Serving as a sequel to his 2020 album King's Disease, it features guest appearances from Eminem, EPMD, A Boogie wit da Hoodie, YG, Lauryn Hill, Charlie Wilson, Blxst, JaboodyDubs and Hit-Boy. As with the previous record, it was executive produced by Nas and Hit-Boy.

The album received widespread acclaim from critics, who praised its storytelling and cohesive production, and commended featured verses from Lauryn Hill on "Nobody" and Eminem on "EPMD 2". At the 64th Annual Grammy Awards, the album was nominated in the Best Rap Album category.

Background
Nas announced the album along with its title, cover art, and release date on July 29, 2021. He shared the tracklist on August 3, 2021.
The first single off the album is "Rare", released with a music video directed by Savannah Setten.

Critical reception

King's Disease II was met with widespread critical acclaim. At Metacritic, which assigns a normalized rating out of 100 to reviews from professional publications, the album received an average score of 86, based on 10 reviews. Will Lavin of NME wrote that "Nas appears more focused than ever before", complimenting his "emotional candour" and comfortability over contemporary trap production. For The Independent, Annabel Nugent stated that King's Disease II "finds Nas where he has always been – comfortable in himself and at ease with confronting his past", noting the chemistry between Nas and Hit-Boy's production. Nugent concluded: "The features lend themselves well to a record that captures nostalgia without devolving into anachronism or retrograde – a fine line that Nas is well-versed in toeing."

Reviewing the album for AllMusic, Fred Thomas claimed "King's Disease II bests its predecessor. Hit-Boy takes on the production once more, but instead of relying mainly on throwback beats and wistful nostalgia, this installment of the series is darker, moodier, and more direct. Hit-Boy's beats are often tense and atmospheric, giving the album a cinematic feel as Nas leans harder into storytelling with his lyricism. He still spends time examining the past, but it's more of a history lesson than a fond remembrance." In Exclaim!, Luke Fox mentioned that "King Nas serves up another reminder that he's no pretender to the throne. The wild ambition has just evolved into calculated wisdom." Concluding the review for Line of Best Fit, Chase McMullen noted that "Nas has crafted an album designated the only would it could be to escape such criticism: an impenetrable one. There's not an ounce of fat, not a wasted moment, not a single beat that doesn't suit its purpose to the letter. It's a monolithic testament to a rapper tired of being treated as both the victor and the underdog at once. It's undeniably clear just which one he is here. King's Disease II is a victory lap that nonetheless never lets up its pace."

The album received a nomination for a Grammy Award for Best Rap Album at the 64th Annual Grammy Awards.

Commercial performance
King's Disease II debuted at number-three on the US Billboard 200, becoming Nas's highest-charting album in nine years, and his 15th top 10 entry on the chart. The album also debuted at number-one on both US Top R&B/Hip-Hop Albums and US Top Rap Albums charts, and sold 56,000 total album-equivalent units within its first week of release. King's Disease IIs first-week sales number topped the sales of its predecessor, which sold over 47,000 copies and debuted at number five on the Billboard 200. It also performed well internationally, reaching the top 10 in Canada and Switzerland, becoming Nas' highest-charting album in the latter region.

Track listing

Notes
 YKTV features additional voices by Justin Davis of Jaboody Dubs/Jaboody Show from Youtube and Twitch.
 "The Pressure" & "Death Row East" features additional vocals by Don Toliver
 "40 Side" features additional vocals by Lil Baby
 "Composure" features uncredited vocals by Shaka Senghor
”My Bible” features uncredited vocals by Nipsey Hussle
 "EPMD 2" is a remix version from the soundtrack Judas and the Black Messiah

Personnel

 Mike Bozzi – mastering engineer
 David Kim – mixer, recording engineer
 Hit-Boy – recording engineer
 Mike Strange – recording engineer (4)
 Tony Campana – recording engineer (4)
 Alexis Estevez – recording engineer (6)
 Julian Miller – recording engineer, vocal editing (9)
 Ms. Lauryn Hill – recording engineer, vocal editing (9)
 Evan Di Pietro – recording engineer (10)
 Marvin Delgado – assistant engineer
 Don Toliver – background vocals (1)
 Garren – background vocals (2)
 James Fauntleroy – background vocals (8)
 Charlie Wilson – lead vocals (10)
 Blxst – lead vocals (11)
 BJ the Chicago Kid – background vocals (14)

Charts

Weekly charts

Year-end charts

References

2021 albums
Nas albums
Albums produced by Eminem
Albums produced by Hit-Boy
Mass Appeal Records albums
Sequel albums